Ogun Waterside is a Local Government Area in Ogun State, Nigeria. It is the only area of the state with a coastline on the Bight of Benin and also borders Lagos Lagoon. Other towns and villages in the local government include: Ilushin, Lukogbe, Iwopin, Olojumeta, Imakun Omi, Ode Omi, Ibu, Itebu Manuwa, Ibiade, Efire, Lomiro, Oni, Ayede, Igele, Ayila and Irokun among others.

Geography
Ogun waterside has an area of 1,000 km and an estimated population of 103,200 as in 2016 resulting in a population density of 103.2/km. The population growth rate is +3.35% per year. It is bordered by Ijebu East local government to the Northwest, Odigbo, Okitipupa and Ilaje local government areas of Ondo state to the Northeast, East and Southeast respectively, Epe local government of Lagos state to the West, and the Atlantic Ocean to the South.

The postal code of the area is 122.

History and Traditional Institutions
The people of Ogun waterside are Yorubas from three major lineages, The Ijebus, The Ikales and the Ilajes, who largely observe similar customs and uphold the same traditions as other yorubas, but shaped to a large extent by their amphibious environment among swamps, large waterbodies such as creeks, rivers and lagoons as well as forests.

Traditional Rulers
Traditional rulers in Ogun waterside are known as Obas and Olojas, among which are the following.

 Lenuwa of Ode Omi.
 Liken of Iwopin.
 Onipe of Ibu.
 Oloja of Ayede.
 Elero of Itebu Manuwa.
 Onirokun of Irokun.
 Alarige of Ibiade.
 Onisin of Ilusin.
 Ojotumoro of Abigi.
 Elefire of Efire
 Osobia of Imakun omi
 Oloni of Oni

Attractions
 Iwopin boat regatta
 Awodikora Okun beach side
 Illushin Rubber estate

References

Local Government Areas in Ogun State
Populated coastal places in Nigeria